Rouhollah Hosseini (born 23 September 1978) is a retired amateur boxer from Iran, who competed in the 2000 Summer Olympics in the Super heavyweight (+91 kg) division and lost in the first round to Mark Simmons of Canada. He is also a two time Asian Games bronze medalist.

References

External links
 

1978 births
Living people
Iranian male boxers
Olympic boxers of Iran
Boxers at the 2000 Summer Olympics
Asian Games bronze medalists for Iran
Asian Games medalists in boxing
Boxers at the 1998 Asian Games
Boxers at the 2010 Asian Games
Medalists at the 1998 Asian Games
Medalists at the 2010 Asian Games
Super-heavyweight boxers
20th-century Iranian people
21st-century Iranian people